Manor Park is a cricket ground in Horsford, Norfolk.  The ground is the main home ground of Norfolk County Cricket Club.

The first recorded match on the ground was in 1986, when Norfolk played their first MCCA Knockout Trophy match on the ground against Suffolk.  The same season they played another MCCA Knockout Trophy match against Oxfordshire at the ground.

Norfolk next played at the ground in 2001, when they played their first Minor Counties Championship match on the ground against Lincolnshire.  From 2001 to present, the ground has hosted 30 Minor Counties Championship matches and 22 MCCA Knockout Trophy matches.

The ground has held List-A matches.  The first List-A match at the ground saw Norfolk play Wales Minor Counties in the 2nd round of the 2001 Cheltenham & Gloucester Trophy.  From 2001 to 2003, the ground hosted 5 List-A matches, the last of which saw Norfolk play Lincolnshire in the 1st round of the 2004 Cheltenham & Gloucester Trophy which was played in 2003.

In local domestic cricket, the ground is the home of Horsford Cricket Club who play in the East Anglian Premier Cricket League.

References

External links
Manor Park on Cricinfo

Cricket grounds in Norfolk
Horsford